Drunk with power may refer to:

 "Drunk with Power", a song from the album Hear Nothing See Nothing Say Nothing by Discharge
 "Drunk with Power", a song from the album "V" Is for Vagina by Puscifer

See also
 Megalomania (disambiguation)